China National Highway 308 (G308) runs northwest from Qingdao, Shandong towards Shijiazhuang, Hebei. It is 637 kilometres in length.

Route and distance

See also 

 China National Highways

Transport in Hebei
Transport in Shandong
308